Louisa Ann Swain (née Gardner; 1801 – January 25, 1880) was the first woman in the United States to vote in a general election. She cast her ballot on September 6, 1870, in Laramie, Wyoming.

Biography

Born Louisa Ann Gardner, her father was lost at sea when she was young. Her mother then returned to her hometown of Charleston, South Carolina, but also died soon after. Orphaned at the age of 10, Swain was placed in the care of the Charleston Orphan House. In 1814, she and another girl were placed with a family as domestic servants for a period of four years, after which Swain was transferred to another family who requested specifically for her. She stayed with them until 1820, then moved to Baltimore where a year later she married Stephen Swain, who operated a chair factory. They had four children and in the 1830s, Stephen sold his business and the family moved, first to Zanesville, Ohio, and later to Richmond, Indiana. In 1869, the Swains moved to Laramie, Wyoming, to join their son Alfred.

On September 6, 1870, she arose early, put on her apron, shawl and bonnet, and walked downtown with a tin pail in order to purchase yeast from a merchant. She walked by the polling place and concluded she would vote while she was there. The polling place had not yet officially opened, but election officials asked her to come in and cast her ballot. She was described by a Laramie newspaper as "a gentle white-haired housewife, Quakerish in appearance".

She was 69 years old when she cast the first ballot by any woman in the United States in a general election. Soon after the election, Stephen and Louisa Swain left Laramie and returned to Maryland to live near a daughter. Stephen died October 6, 1872, in Maryland. Louisa died January 25, 1880, in Lutherville, Maryland. She was buried in the Friends Burial Ground on Harford Road in Baltimore.

Legacy

The Louisa Swain Foundation was established in 2001 (as the Laramie Foundation) and is dedicated to preserving and celebrating Swain's heritage and history and "fostering education in the areas of democracy, human rights and suffrage". The Foundation runs the Wyoming House for Historic Women (also known as the Wyoming Women's History House) in Laramie, Wyoming, which celebrates thirteen women, including Swain. A statue of her in her honor was dedicated in front of the museum in 2005.

Congress recognized September 6, 2008, as Louisa Swain Day via House Concurrent Resolution 378.

In 2022 Congress named the federal office building at 308 W. 21st Street in Cheyenne, Wyoming, the Louisa Swain Federal Office Building.

References

External links
 "Select Digital Collection of Eliza Ann Swain" at the American Heritage Center Digital Collection
Louisa A. Swain Materials at the University of Wyoming – American Heritage Center
Blog post based on the archives at the AHC that centers on early suffragists in Wyoming and Lousia A Swain
 "First Woman to Vote – Claimants". About.com
 "Women: As Maine Goes ...". Time (September 5, 1960)
 "September 6: National Louisa Swain Day". The Louisa Swain Foundation.

1801 births
1880 deaths
American activists
People from Laramie, Wyoming
People from Norfolk, Virginia
Women in Wyoming politics